Aurora Nilsson, also known as Rora Asim Khan (1 January 1894 – 1972), was a Swedish writer who became known for her autobiographical depiction, Flykten från harem ("Escape from Harem"), about her experiences in Afghanistan during her marriage to an Afghan diplomat, Asim Khan, in the 1920s. A novel by Thomas Löfström is based upon her story. Her autobiography gives a valuable insight in the life of a harem in 1920s Afghanistan. Her divorce (1927) was at the time unique in Afghanistan.

Early life and marriage 
Nilsson was born Västerhaninge. In 1925, she was studying art in Berlin; the Golden Twenties was a vibrant period in the history of the city. There she met and married Asim Khan, an Afghan who was the son of a former government minister, who was studying technique at the expense of the Afghan government. The Afghan embassy acknowledged the marriage after Nilsson signed a statement that she would accept Afghan customs and, some time in the future, convert to Islam. She never did convert, however.

The newly-married couple travelled to Afghanistan in 1926. During the journey, Khan changed, according to Nilsson, from a modern person to a man more and more aware of Afghan customs the closer they came to his homeland. En route he abused her twice. In Kabul, Nilsson was severely shocked about her new living conditions and was not able to adjust herself to them. She was forced to wear a veil (hijab) and was not allowed to leave the house except with her husband's permission, nor look out of the windows, or to talk when she visited a shop (purdah). She also discovered that her husband had a servant who was in fact his second wife. She aroused a lot of attention.

Her husband was not given any governmental employment, because she had not converted. He therefore gave her permission to visit the government, the royal court, and women in different positions to try to get him a job. In her book, she describes the people, customs and events of contemporary Afghanistan. With the help of Khan's aunt, who was a lady-in-waiting to the queen, she visited the royal court in Paghman and Darullaman, and includes descriptions in her book of queen consort Soraya Tarzi, a Syrian-educated moderniser, and the mother of the king, Ulya (Ulli) Hazrat, whose name she spells as Ollja Hassrat. With their encouragement, she talked a lot about European customs. She befriended the king's mother, whom she describes as influential and dominant, demonstrated dance and gymnastics for her and acted as her photographer. She failed to acquire a position for Khan, who threatened to kill or to sell her. According to Nilsson a German woman, the widow of an Afridi man named Abdullah Khan, had fled to the city with her children from her late husband's successor, was sold at public auction and obtained her freedom by being bought by the German embassy for 7,000 marks.

In 1927, Nilsson managed to be granted a divorce with the support of the German embassy. The divorce was described as unique, as it was not the custom for a woman to divorce a man. The German embassy helped her to get a room in a hotel while she waited for money from Sweden to leave the country. Her divorce was viewed as a scandal in Kabul, and she was harassed, also by the officials she visited for help. The officials denied her divorce on the grounds that she was a Muslim despite the fact that she had never converted, claimed she needed an Afghan passport to leave the country, and offered her money to return to her former husband. When she finally arrived at the border, she was again stopped with an offer of money if she returned to marriage. She declined with the words: "No, I do not need any money! I need nothing from Afghanistan! Only my freedom!"

Aftermath 
After her divorce, Aurora Nilsson returned to Sweden, where she published a book about her experiences in 1928. In 1930, Nilsson married ice-hockey player Carl Abrahamsson.

The divorce reportedly caused her ex-husband to lose face in Afghan society, and prevented him from gaining any political post. He murdered three officials at the British embassy and in 1933 was executed. He was motivated by the desire to create conflict between the pro-British king Mohammed Nadir Shah and Great Britain, thereby bringing about the fall of Nadir and the reinstatement of the deposed king Amanullah Khan. His act is considered to have contributed to the deposition of King Nadir later the same year.

Aurora Nilsson died in Södertälje.

Work 
 Flykten från harem (English: Flight from Harem) (1928)

In popular culture 

See also 
 Gunnel Gummeson
 Betty Mahmoody
 European influence in Afghanistan
 Phyllis Chesler

References 

1894 births
1972 deaths
20th-century Swedish women writers
People from Södertälje
20th-century memoirists
Swedish expatriates in Germany